Gilbert G. Collins (1830–1885) was the 26th mayor of Columbus, Ohio and the 23rd person to serve in that office.   He served Columbus for one term.  His successor, George S. Peters, took office in 1881.  He died in 1885.

References

Bibliography

External links
Gilbert G. Collins at Political Graveyard

Mayors of Columbus, Ohio
1830 births
1885 deaths
People from Essex County, New Jersey
19th-century American politicians